The kouprey (Bos sauveli), also known as the forest ox, is a possibly extinct species of forest-dwelling wild bovine native to Southeast Asia. A young male was sent to the Paris Zoological Park in 1937 and was described by the French zoologist Achille Urbain who declared it the holotype. The kouprey has a tall, narrow body, long legs, a humped back and long horns.

The kouprey has not been sighted since 1969–1970. A camera trapping survey in the region of these sightings failed to document it in 2011. It has been listed as Critically Endangered, and possibly extinct, on the IUCN Red List since 1996.

The kouprey is the national animal of Cambodia and is also the nickname of their football team.

Description

The kouprey is believed to be a close relative of the aurochs (Bos primigenius), gaur (B. gaurus), and banteng (B. javanicus). A very large ungulate, the kouprey can approach similar sizes to the wild water buffalo (Bubalus arnee).

Kouprey have tall, narrow bodies, with long legs and humped backs. They can be grey, dark brown or black. The horns of the female are lyre-shaped, with antelope-like upward spirals. The horns of the male are wide, and arch forwards and upward; they begin to fray at the tips at about three years of age. Both sexes have notched nostrils and long tails.

Habitat and distribution
Historical distribution of this species included Cambodia, southern Laos, east Thailand, and western Vietnam. They are thought to be extinct in all areas outside of Cambodia. If still extant, it likely exists in Lomphat Wildlife Sanctuary, Phnom Prich Wildlife Sanctuary, Mondulkiri Protected Forest, and/or Keo Seima Wildlife Sanctuary.

Kouprey live in low, partially forested hills, where they eat mainly grass. Their preferred habitat is open forest and savannas often near thick monsoon forests. They are diurnal, eating in the open at night and under the forest cover during the day. They usually travel up to 15 km in a night.

They live in herds of up to 20 and are usually led by a single female. These herds generally consist of cows and calves, but have bulls during the dry season. Older males form bachelor herds. Many herds are known to break up and rejoin as they travel and have been found to be mixed in with herds of banteng or wild buffalo.

Diet
The kouprey predominantly graze on grasses, as well as shoots of bamboo, ploong, and koompassia species. They spend a lot of time around salt licks, mud pits, water holes. Mud baths help in repelling biting insects.

Status
There are estimated to be fewer than 250 kouprey left in the world. There is some speculation on whether or not they are already extinct.

These low numbers are attributed to uncontrolled hunting by locals and soldiers for meat, horns and skulls for use in traditional Chinese medicine, in conjunction with diseases introduced from cattle and loss of habitat due to agriculture and logging activity.

Ongoing conservation efforts
Kouprey are legally protected in all range states and may be present in some protected areas. Prince Sihanouk designated it as the national animal of Cambodia in the 1960s, partly due to its mystique. On the 15th and 16th of January 1988, the University of Hanoi hosted the International Workshop on the Kouprey: Conservation Programme. Headed and coordinated by the IUCN, in a collaboration with the governments of Cambodia, Laos, Vietnam, and Thailand, aimed to create a feasible and realistic action plan for immediate kouprey conservation. Other organizations in attendance and contributing to the action plan were the Association of Zoos and Aquariums, the Centre for Environmental Studies, VNIUCN Species Survival Commission (SSC), the Asian Wild Cattle Specialist Group, as well as WWF International.

The 2008 IUCN Red List report lists the kouprey as critically endangered (possibly extinct).

Large mammal surveys continue to take place in Cambodia, hoping to rediscover living kouprey. Other surveys have been taking place in the kouprey's historical range as recently as 2011. These surveys were done to determine the regions in their range with the highest probability of the kouprey's persistence. This is based on the habitat type and survey effort to date. During the last decade, several searches for the animal have proven fruitless.

There is no captive population. The only individual in a western zoo was sent to the Paris Zoological Park in 1937; that was the individual designated as the holotype by Urbain. It died early in World War II.

Relation to other species
Research published by Northwestern University in London's Journal of Zoology indicated a comparison of mitochondrial sequences showed the kouprey might be a hybrid between a zebu and a banteng. However, the authors of this study rescinded their conclusion. A later study in 2021 based on a whole nuclear genome found that the kouprey represented a distinct species, but formed a polytomy with the banteng and gaur due to incomplete lineage sorting, suggesting extensive hybridisation between their ancestors, resulting in the mitochondrial DNA of kouprey being nested within a group including a mixture of both banteng and gaur. The study also showed that zebu had introgressed ancestry from some Asian Bos, resulting in some of their mitochondrial lineages being nested within this group.

References

 Alexandre Hassanin, and Anne Ropiquet, 2007. Resolving a zoological mystery: the kouprey is a real species, Proc. R. Soc. B, 
 G. J. Galbreath, J. C. Mordacq, F. H. Weiler, 2006. Genetically solving a zoological mystery: was the kouprey (Bos sauveli) a feral hybrid? Journal of Zoology 270 (4): 561–564.
 Hassanin, A., and Ropiquet, A. 2004. Molecular phylogeny of the tribe Bovini (Bovidae, Bovinae) and the taxonomic status of the kouprey, Bos sauveli Urbain 1937. Mol. Phylogenet. Evol. 33(3):896-907.
 Steve Hendrix: Quest for the Kouprey, International Wildlife Magazine, 25 (5) 1995, p. 20-23.  
 J.R. McKinnon/S.N. Stuart: The Kouprey - An action plan for its conservation. Gland, Switzerland 1989.  
 Steve Hendrix: The ultimate nowhere. Trekking through the Cambodian outback in search of the Kouprey, Chicago Tribune - 19 December 1999.
 MacKinnon, J.R., S. N. Stuart. "The Kouprey: An Action Plan for its Conservation. "Hanoi University. 15 Jan. 1988. Web 13 Last Kouprey: Final Project to the Critical Ecosystem Partnership Fund for Grant Number GA 10/0.8" Global Wildlife Conservation. Austin, TX, 25 Apr. 2011. Web 13 Nov. 2013.

External links
 Ultimate ungulate: Bos_sauveli
 Animal info page on kouprey
 CSEW factsheet on kouprey

 Copy of New York Times item about possible hybrid origin.

Bovines
Mammals of Laos
Mammals of Vietnam
Mammals of Cambodia
Mammals of Thailand
National symbols of Cambodia
Mammals described in 1937
Critically endangered fauna of Asia